Anthony Butler may refer to:

 Tony Butler (footballer)
Anthony Butler (MP) for Wallingford (UK Parliament constituency)
Tony Butler (musician)
Anthony Butler (diplomat), US ambassador to Mexico in the 1830s
Anthony Butler (American football) (born 1997), American football player

See also
Tony Butler (disambiguation)